Bigu may refer to:

 Bigu (grain avoidance)
 Bigu Rural Municipality, Nepal
 Bigu, Iran